Bazgiyevo (Baźğıya) is a rural locality (a selo) and the administrative centre of Bazgiyevsky Selsoviet, Sharansky District, Bashkortostan, Russia. The population was 465 as of 2010. There are 3 streets.

Geography 
Bazgiyevo is located 16 km southeast of Sharan (the district's administrative centre) by road. Novy Tamyan is the nearest rural locality.

References 

Rural localities in Sharansky District